is a Japanese former professional wrestler and current mixed martial artist currently competing in the Bantamweight division of Rizin Fighting Federation. A professional competitor since 2000, he is a veteran of ONE Championship, DEEP, ZST, Pancrase, PRIDE Fighting Championships, and Cage Rage. Imanari also has had a successful career in  Combat Wrestling, placing as high as third and second in their All-Japan championship tournaments. He was in the final Cage Rage Featherweight Champion, DEEP Bantamweight Champion, two-time DEEP Featherweight Champion and DREAM Japan Grand Prix Finalist.

Mixed martial arts career
After a childhood marked by a spinal condition which required surgery three times, Masakazu had his first contact with combat sports at age 18, training kickboxing and Catch wrestling at the Fujiwara Dojo by Satoru Sayama's mediation. He later moved to Antonio Inoki's Universal Fighting-Arts Organization, and then Kingdom Ehrgeiz, where he trained Shoot fighting (a fighting style based on Catch wrestling) and MMA with Hidetada Irie before doing his amateur debut.

ZST
Imanari gained popularity during his mixed martial arts career in Japanese promotion ZST fighting the likes of top Lightweights including Dokonjonosuke Mishima, Jorge Gurgel and Marcus Aurélio despite being a much smaller Featherweight. He defeated Gurgel, who is a Brazilian jiu-jitsu black belt former UFC fighter via Catch wrestling staple submission (heel hook) while being lighter in weight. Imanari also defeated former Cage Warriors Featherweight Champion Danny Batten. In the first round Batten took Imanari down on the ropes but Imanari attempted a triangle choke. Batten escaped it but Imanari then transitioned to an armbar causing Batten to submit in just over 40 seconds.

DEEP
Imanari moved on to compete in DEEP where he defeated a top WEC contender and the former WEC Featherweight Champion Mike Brown via submission (heel hook) where Brown's leg became dislocated. Imanari now a top contender in DEEP went on to compete for the title shot against Yoshiro Maeda in which he defeated Maeda via submission (toe hold) to become the new DEEP Featherweight Champion. Imanari made his first KO victory in his first defense for the belt against Takeshi Yamazaki with an up kick.

Cage Rage
His next fight, which was his first fight outside Japan, was in London, England where he became the Cage Rage World Featherweight Champion by defeating Robbie Olivier with a flying armbar at Cage Rage 20. This accomplishment made him the only mixed martial artist in the Featherweight division to hold belts in two separate major promotions (DEEP and Cage Rage). He defended his Cage Rage belt for the first time against Jean Silva, winning by reverse heel hook in the first round, injuring Silva's knee in the process.

DREAM

DREAM Featherweight Grand Prix
Imanari was a participant in the Dream Featherweight (63 kg / 138 lb) Grand Prix and won his first-round matchup against Atsushi Yamamoto by split decision at DREAM 7 but lost to current DREAM Featherweight Champion Bibiano Fernandes by unanimous decision at DREAM 9.

DREAM Bantamweight Grand Prix
In 2011 Imanari returned to DREAM to take part in the DREAM Bantamweight Japan Tournament. He won his first two tournament fights in a single night defeating both Keisuke Fujiwara and Kenji Osawa at Dream: Fight for Japan!. The tournament finals took place at Dream: Japan GP Final where Imanari faced off with Hideo Tokoro. Tokoro defeated Imanari to win the tournament, the second-place finish gained Imanari entrance into the Bantamweight Grand Prix. Imanari faced Abel Cullum in the opening round of the Bantamweight Grand Prix at Dream 17 at Saitama Super Arena in Saitama, Japan, on Sept. 24.  He won the bout via submission in the third round.  In the semifinal round at Fight For Japan: Genki Desu Ka Omisoka 2011, Imanari lost to Antonio Banuelos via split decision.

ONE Fighting Championship
On January 31, 2012 it was announced that Imanari would be fighting for ONE Fighting Championship, who have a partnership with DREAM which allows both organizations to share fighters. He faced unbeaten URCC Flyweight Champion Kevin Belingon at ONE Fighting Championship 3 at the Singapore Indoor Stadium on March 31. He won the fight via submission in the first round.

After over a year away from the sport, Imanari returned to face Yuta Nezu at Road to ONE 3: Tokyo Fight Night on September 10, 2020. Imanari lost the fight by unanimous decision.

Rizin Fighting Federation 
Imanari faced Kenta Takizawa in the opening round of the Bantamweight Grand Prix at Rizin 29 on May 30, 2021. He lost the bout via unanimous decision.

Imanari faced Takeshi Kasugai on October 10, 2021 at Rizin Landmark Vol.1. He won the bout via armbar in the first round.

Imanari faced Chihiro Suzuki at Rizin Landmark 4 on November 6, 2022. He lost the bout via unanimous decision.

Professional grappling career

Imanari competed at Quintet Fight Night 5 on October 27, 2020 as one of the members of Team Tokoro plus a 2nd. He registered two draws at the event but his team won the tournament.

He then faced Kenta Iwamoto in the main event of Battle Hazard 8 on November 22, 2020. He lost the match by submission after Iwamoto caught him in an arm-triangle choke.

Imanari competed against Mikey Musumeci in a submission grappling match at ONE 156 on April 22, 2022. Musumeci submitted him with a rear-naked choke at 4:09 that earned a $50,000 'Performance Bonus'.

Team allegiances
Imanari left Catch wrestling based team Paraestra in 2008 and founded Nippon Top Team with Shinya Aoki and Satoru Kitaoka. However, Aoki left for Evolve MMA of Singapore, whereas Kitaoka joined Lotus Paraestra, Setagaya branch of Paraestra. Consequently, Imanari became a member of Team Roken.

Imanari is an A-level Shoot wrestler (better known as Catch wrestling in the west) under Yuki Nakai. He was later also presented a Brazilian jiu-jitsu black belt by Marco Barbosa of Barbosa jiu-jitsu.

Fighting style
Imanari is primarily a grappler, and is universally known for his skill and preference for leglocks, which gained him the nickname of "Ashikan Judan" ("The Great Master of Leg Submissions"). Though his striking game is considered inferior, Imanari often engages in stand-up battles in order to bait the opponent to the ground, usually by dropping down after or while seizing control of his leg or by way of ashi garami. He stands out for his dexterity in toehold and heel hook variations, and is an avid user of the 50/50 guard in order to transition between submission attempts. He describes his signature leglock style as not based in sambo as it is popularly believed, but "purely self-taught", and explained his preference for it as "because it hurts the opponent".

The "Imanari Roll" (rolling from a stand up position into a leglock) and the "Imanari Choke" (a combination of an omoplata and a rear naked choke) are grappling moves named after him due to his usage of them.

Championships and accomplishments
Cage Rage
Cage Rage World Featherweight Championship (One time, first, last)
One Successful Title Defense
DEEP
DEEP Bantamweight Championship (One time; first)
Two Successful Title Defenses
DEEP Featherweight Championship (Two times, first)
One Successful Title Defense
DREAM
2011 Japan Bantamweight Grand Prix Runner Up
2011 World Bantamweight Grand Prix Semifinalist

Mixed martial arts record

|-
|Loss
|align=center| 39–22–2
|Chihiro Suzuki
|Decision (unanimous)
|Rizin Landmark 4
|
|align=center|3
|align=center|5:00
|Nagoya, Japan
|
|-
| Loss
| align=center | 39–21–2
|Takahiro Ashida
|Decision (unanimous)
|Deep: 109 Impact
|
|align=center|3
|align=center|5:00
|Tokyo, Japan
|
|-
| Win
| align=center | 
|Takeshi Kasugai
|Submission (armbar)
|Rizin Landmark 1
|
|align=center|1
|align=center|2:50
|Tokyo, Japan
|
|-
| Loss
| align=center | 38–20–2
|Kenta Takizawa
|Decision (unanimous)
|Rizin 29
|
|align=center|3
|align=center|5:00
|Osaka, Japan
|
|-
| Loss
| align=center | 38–19–2
| Yuta Nezu
| Decision (unanimous)
| Road to ONE 3: Tokyo Fight Night
| 
| align=center | 3
| align=center | 5:00
| Tokyo, Japan
|
|-
| Win
| align=center | 38–18–2
| Kwon Won Il
| Submission (heel hook)
| ONE: Call to Greatness
| 
| align=center | 1
| align=center | 0:53
| Kallang, Singapore
| 
|-
| Win
| align=center | 37–18–2
| Radeem Rahman
| Submission (armbar)
| ONE: Pursuit of Greatness
| 
| align=center | 1
| align=center | 1:23
| Yangon, Myanmar
| 
|-
|  Loss
| align=center| 36–18–2
| Dae Hwan Kim
| Decision (unanimous)
| ONE: Heroes of Honor
| 
| align=center|3
| align=center|5:00
| Manila, Philippines
|
|-
|  Loss
| align=center| 36–17–2
| Yusup Saadulaev
| Decision (unanimous)
| ONE: Kings of Courage
| 
| align=center| 3
| align=center| 5:00
| Jakarta, Indonesia
|
|-
|  Win
| align=center| 36–16–2
| Juri Ohara
| Submission (leglock)
| DEEP 78 Impact: Welterweight GP 2nd Round
| 
| align=center| 1
| align=center| 0:23
| Tokyo, Japan
|
|-
|  Win
| align=center| 35–16–2
| Tatsunao Nagakura
| Decision (split)
| DEEP Cage Impact 2016: DEEP vs. WSOF-GC
| 
| align=center| 3
| align=center| 5:00
| Tokyo, Japan
|
|-
|  Win
| align=center| 34–16–2
| Yoshihiko Shinzato
| Submission (heel hook)
| DEEP: Cage Impact 2016
| 
| align=center| 1
| align=center| 0:32
| Tokyo, Japan
|
|-
|  Loss
| align=center| 33–16–2
| Jae Eun Byeon
| Decision (Majority)
| DEEP: 77 Impact
| 
| align=center| 3
| align=center| 5:00
| Tokyo, Japan
|
|-
|  Win
| align=center| 33–15–2
| Nam Phan
| Submission (heel hook)
| DEEP Cage Impact 2016
| 
| align=center| 1
| align=center| 0:35
| Tokyo, Japan
|
|-
|  Loss
| align=center| 32–15–2
| Kazunori Yokota
| Decision (unanimous)
| DEEP: 74 Impact
| 
| align=center| 3
| align=center| 5:00
| Tokyo, Japan
|
|-
|  Win
| align=center| 32–14–2
| Mun Hwan Yang
| Submission (heel hook)
| DEEP: Cage Impact 2015
| 
| align=center| 1
| align=center| 0:21
| Tokyo, Japan
|
|-
|  Win
| align=center| 31–14–2
| Cristian Binda
| Submission (armbar)
| Venator FC: Guerrieri Italiani Finals
| 
| align=center| 1
| align=center| 2:33
| Bologna, Italy
|
|-
|  Win
| align=center| 30–14–2
| Daisuke Maku
| Submission (armbar)
| DEEP: Hachioji Chojin Matsuri
| 
| align=center| 1
| align=center| 4:11
| Tokyo, Japan
|
|-
|  Win
| align=center| 29–14–2
| Kenichi Ito
| Submission (rear-naked choke)
| Grandslam MMA 2: Way of the Cage
| 
| align=center| 2
| align=center| 4:06
| Tokyo, Japan
|
|-
|  Loss
| align=center| 28–14–2
| Mizuto Hirota
| TKO (punches)
| DEEP: 69 Impact
| 
| align=center| 2
| align=center| 1:38
| Tokyo, Japan
| 
|-
| Win
| align=center| 28–13–2
| Jung Park
| Submission (heel hook)
| DEEP: 68 Impact
| 
| align=center| 1
| align=center| 0:22
| Tokyo, Japan
|
|-
| Loss
| align=center| 27–13–2
| Haruo Ochi
| TKO (doctor stoppage)
| DEEP: 67 Impact
| 
| align=center| 2
| align=center| 0:51
| Tokyo, Japan
|
|-
| Loss
| align=center| 27–12–2
| Yuki Montoya
| Decision (unanimous)
| DEEP: 65 Impact
| 
| align=center| 3
| align=center| 5:00
| Tokyo, Japan
|
|-
| Win
| align=center| 27–11–2
| Kenichi Ito
| Decision (unanimous)
| DEEP: 61 Impact
| 
| align=center| 2
| align=center| 5:00
| Tokyo, Japan
| 
|-
| Win
| align=center| 26–11–2
| Masahiro Oishi
| Submission (toe hold)
| DEEP: 59 Impact
| 
| align=center| 1
| align=center| 1:01
| Tokyo, Japan
| 
|-
| Loss
| align=center| 25–11–2
| Leandro Issa
| Decision (unanimous)
| ONE Fighting Championship: Destiny of Warriors
| 
| align=center| 3
| align=center| 5:00
| Kuala Lumpur, Malaysia
| 
|-
| Win
| align=center| 25–10–2
| Kevin Belingon
| Submission (reverse heel hook)
| ONE Fighting Championship: War of the Lions
| 
| align=center| 1
| align=center| 1:18
| Kallang, Singapore
| 
|-
| Loss
| align=center| 24–10–2
| Antonio Banuelos
| Decision (split)
| Fight For Japan: Genki Desu Ka Omisoka 2011
| 
| align=center| 2
| align=center| 5:00
| Tokyo, Japan
| 
|-
| Win
| align=center| 24–9–2
| Abel Cullum
| Submission (armbar)
| Dream 17
| 
| align=center| 3
| align=center| 0:46
| Saitama, Japan
| 
|-
| Loss
| align=center| 23–9–2
| Hideo Tokoro
| Decision (unanimous)
| DREAM: Japan GP Final
| 
| align=center| 2
| align=center| 5:00
| Tokyo, Japan
| 
|-
| Win
| align=center| 23–8–2
| Kenji Osawa
| Submission (heel hook)
| DREAM: Fight for Japan!
| 
| align=center| 2
| align=center| 0:58
| Saitama, Japan
| 
|-
| Win
| align=center| 22–8–2
| Keisuke Fujiwara
| Decision (unanimous)
| DREAM: Fight for Japan!
| 
| align=center| 2
| align=center| 5:00
| Saitama, Japan
| 
|-
| Loss
| align=center| 21–8–2
| Hiroshi Nakamura
| Decision (unanimous)
| DEEP: 52 Impact
| 
| align=center| 3
| align=center| 5:00
| Tokyo, Japan
| 
|-
| Win
| align=center| 21–7–2
| Daiki Hata
| Decision (majority)
| DEEP: 50 Impact
| 
| align=center| 3
| align=center| 5:00
| Tokyo, Japan
| 
|-
| Win
| align=center| 20–7–2
| Tomoya Miyashita
| Decision (unanimous)
| DEEP: 49 Impact
| 
| align=center| 3
| align=center| 5:00
| Tokyo, Japan
| 
|-
| Win
| align=center| 19–7–2
| Isao Terada
| Submission (armbar)
| DEEP: 47 Impact
| 
| align=center| 3
| align=center| 0:27
| Tokyo, Japan
| 
|-
| Win
| align=center| 18–7–2
| Justin Cruz
| Submission (omoplata crossface)
| DEEP: Cage Impact 2009
| 
| align=center| 1
| align=center| 2:39
| Tokyo, Japan
| 
|-
| Win
| align=center| 17–7–2
| Tomohiko Hori
| Decision (unanimous)
| DEEP: 43 Impact
| 
| align=center| 3
| align=center| 5:00
| Tokyo, Japan
| 
|-
| Loss
| align=center| 16–7–2
| Bibiano Fernandes
| Decision (unanimous)
| DREAM 9
| 
| align=center| 2
| align=center| 5:00
| Saitama, Japan
| 
|-
| Win
| align=center| 16–6–2
| Atsushi Yamamoto
| Decision (split)
| DREAM 7
| 
| align=center| 2
| align=center| 5:00
| Saitama, Japan
| 
|-
| Win
| align=center| 15–6–2
| Hiroshi Umemura
| Submission (heel hook)
| DEEP: 37 Impact
| 
| align=center| 1
| align=center| 0:29
| Tokyo, Japan
| 
|-
| Loss
| align=center| 14–6–2
| Dokonjonosuke Mishima
| Decision (majority)
| DEEP: 35 Impact
| 
| align=center| 3
| align=center| 5:00
| Tokyo, Japan
| 
|-
| Win
| align=center| 14–5–2
| Jean Silva
| Submission (heel hook)
| Cage Rage 25
| 
| align=center| 1
| align=center| 2:30
| London, England
| 
|-
| Win
| align=center| 13–5–2
| Hiroyuki Abe
| Submission (toe hold)
| DEEP: 32 Impact
| 
| align=center| 3
| align=center| 4:32
| Tokyo, Japan
| 
|-
| Win
| align=center| 12–5–2
| Kim Jong-Man
| Submission (armbar)
| DEEP: 31 Impact
| 
| align=center| 1
| align=center| 3:28
| Tokyo, Japan
| 
|-
| Win
| align=center| 11–5–2
| Robbie Olivier
| Submission (armbar)
| Cage Rage 20
| 
| align=center| 1
| align=center| 0:27
| London, England
| 
|-
| Win
| align=center| 10–5–2
| Takeshi Yamazaki
| KO (upkick)
| DEEP: 26 Impact
| 
| align=center| 3
| align=center| 1:49
| Tokyo, Japan
| 
|-
| Loss
| align=center| 9–5–2
| Fredson Paixão
| Decision (majority)
| DEEP: 25 Impact
| 
| align=center| 3
| align=center| 5:00
| Tokyo, Japan
| 
|-
| Win
| align=center| 9–4–2
| Yoshiro Maeda
| Submission (toe hold)
| DEEP: 22 Impact
| 
| align=center| 3
| align=center| 1:31
| Tokyo, Japan
| 
|-
| Win
| align=center| 8–4–2
| Mike Brown
| Submission (rolling kneebar)
| DEEP: 22 Impact
| 
| align=center| 2
| align=center| 3:38
| Tokyo, Japan
| 
|-
| Win
| align=center| 7–4–2
| Fábio Mello
| Decision (unanimous)
| DEEP: 21st Impact
| 
| align=center| 3
| align=center| 5:00
| Tokyo, Japan
| 
|-
| Loss
| align=center| 6–4–2
| Joachim Hansen
| KO (knee)
| PRIDE Bushido 8
| 
| align=center| 1
| align=center| 2:34
| Nagoya, Japan
| 
|-
| Draw
| align=center| 6–3–2
| Yoshiro Maeda
| Draw (majority)
| DEEP: 18th Impact
| 
| align=center| 3
| align=center| 5:00
| Tokyo, Japan
| 
|-
| Win
| align=center| 6–3–1
| Renato Tavares
| Submission (heel hook)
| DEEP: 17th Impact
| 
| align=center| 2
| align=center| 2:36
| Nagoya, Japan
| 
|-
| Loss
| align=center| 5–3–1
| Luiz Firmino
| Decision (unanimous)
| PRIDE Bushido 5
| 
| align=center| 2
| align=center| 5:00
| Osaka, Japan
| 
|-
| Loss
| align=center| 5–2–1
| Marcus Aurélio
| Decision (split)
| Zst: Grand Prix Final Round
| 
| align=center| 2
| align=center| 5:00
| Tokyo, Japan
| 
|-
| Win
| align=center| 5–1–1
| Jorge Gurgel
| Submission (heel hook)
| Zst: Grand Prix Opening Round
| 
| align=center| 1
| align=center| 0:32
| Tokyo, Japan
| 
|-
| Loss
| align=center| 4–1–1
| Dokonjonosuke Mishima
| TKO (punches)
| DEEP: 11th Impact
| 
| align=center| 2
| align=center| 2:58
| Osaka, Japan
| 
|-
| Win
| align=center| 4–0–1
| Danny Batten
| Submission (armbar)
| Zst: The Battlefield 3
| 
| align=center| 1
| align=center| 0:43
| Tokyo, Japan
| 
|-
| Win
| align=center| 3–0–1
| Erikas Petraitis
| Decision (unanimous)
| Zst: The Battlefield 2
| 
| align=center| 2
| align=center| 5:00
| Tokyo, Japan
| 
|-
| Win
| align=center| 2–0–1
| Yuji Oba
| Decision (majority)
| Pancrase: 2002 Anniversary Show
| 
| align=center| 2
| align=center| 5:00
| Yokohama, Japan
| 
|-
| Win
| align=center| 1–0–1
| Tokusaburo Iwama
| Submission (heel hook)
| Premium Challenge
| 
| align=center| 1
| align=center| 3:24
| Tokyo, Japan
| 
|-
| Draw
| align=center| 0–0–1
| Ryoji Sai
| Technical Draw
| Titan Fighting Championship 1
| 
| align=center| 1
| align=center| 1:29
| Tokyo, Japan
|

See also
List of current ONE fighters

References

External links

Free instructional - Master of Leglocks by Masakazu Imanari Free online instructional by Masakazu Imanari

1976 births
Living people
People from Hadano, Kanagawa
Sportspeople from Kanagawa Prefecture
Japanese male mixed martial artists
Bantamweight mixed martial artists
Featherweight mixed martial artists
Lightweight mixed martial artists
Mixed martial artists utilizing kickboxing
Mixed martial artists utilizing catch wrestling
Mixed martial artists utilizing shoot wrestling
Mixed martial artists utilizing Brazilian jiu-jitsu
Japanese practitioners of Brazilian jiu-jitsu
People awarded a black belt in Brazilian jiu-jitsu
Deep (mixed martial arts) champions